Alfred Grandidier (20 December 1836 – 13 September 1921)  was a French naturalist  and explorer.

From a very wealthy family, at the age of 20, he and his brother, Ernest Grandidier (1833–1912), undertook a voyage around the world. At first they were led by the astronomer and physicist Pierre Jules César Janssen (1824–1907), but when Janssen fell sick and had to return to France after about six months, the brothers continued the journey.

They visited South America in 1858 and 1859 and in particular the Andes, Peru, Chile, Bolivia, Argentina and Brazil. During this voyage they gathered a significant collection of specimens which were analyzed, in 1860, by Ernest.

The two brothers parted ways after this. Ernest Grandidier went to China and collected a vast number of specimens which are now in the Louvre and the Guimet museum. Alfred travelled to India, reaching it in 1863. He had intended to explore the high plateau of Tibet, but was prevented by a severe attack of fever.

Grandidier travelled to Zanzibar to recuperate, remaining some time and making important collections and publishing an account of his findings. He then visited the island of Réunion and in 1865 made his first visit to Madagascar. He became devoted to the study of the island, revisiting in 1866 and 1868. He finally returned permanently to France in 1870. During his explorations he crossed the island three times, travelling 3000 kilometers in the interior and 2500 along the coast. He made observations which resulted in the production of a map of the island used in future expeditions.

After returning to France he began to work on his great work, L'Histoire physique, naturelle et politique de Madagascar. This work was undertaken in cooperation with others such as Alphonse Milne-Edwards and Leon Vaillant. This work ran to 40 volumes, the final volumes published posthumously by his son Guillaume Grandidier. He described about 50 new species of reptiles and amphibians.

Alfred Grandidier's work drew the attention of the French government to Madagascar, which it would annex at the end of 1890.

He was elected to the French Academy of Sciences in 1885 and was the president of the French Geographical Society from 1901 to 1905. The Royal Geographical Society awarded him their Founder's Medal in 1906.

Honours
Oplurus grandidieri, a species of lizard, and Xenotyphlops grandidieri, a species of snake, were named in his honour by French herpetologist François Mocquard.  The mineral grandidierite, discovered in Madagascar, was also named in his honour,<ref>Lacroix A (1902). "Note préliminaire sur une nouvelle espèce minérale.. ". Bulletin de la Société Française de Minéralogie 25: 85-86.</ref> as is the giant Grandidier baobab. Also, Grandidiera boivinii a flowering shrub from Africa was named after him in 1866 by French botanist Hippolyte François Jaubert. The plant genus Didierea is also named after him.

Works
Partial list.
Grandidier A (1867). "Description de quatre espèces nouvelles de Lepidopteres decouvertes sur la cote sud-oust de Madagascar ". Revue et Magasin de Zoologie Pure et Appliquee 19: 272–275.   
Grandidier A (1887). Histoire physique, naturelle et politique de Madagascar. Volumes 18 & 19. Paris: Imprimerie Nationale.  
Grandidier A (1885–1887). "Histoire naturelle des lepidopteres ". Histoire Physique, Naturelle et Politique de Madagascar'' 18 [1887]: i-v, 1–364; 19 [1885].

See also
 :Category:Taxa named by Alfred Grandidier

References

External links
Obituary in The Auk 39: 453. (July 1922)
Gallica has several digitised on line digitised works by Grandidier.
Aluka – Cookies are absent/required at www.aluka.org The Grandidier library and photograph collection.

1836 births
1921 deaths
French taxonomists
19th-century French botanists
French entomologists
French explorers
French ornithologists
Botanists active in Africa
Members of the French Academy of Sciences
Members of the Ligue de la patrie française
19th-century French zoologists
20th-century French zoologists